The Bangladeshi community in Poland consists of migrants from Bangladesh to Poland and their locally born descendants. In 1994 illegal migrants from Pakistan and Bangladesh arrived in Poland through Ukraine on the way to the west on a Soviet helicopter. Bangladesh has sent skilled migrants to Poland, including trade trainers.
In recent days you will find many Bangladeshi migrants running their successful Kebab (Doner Kebab) business almost all over Poland. This Kebab became a very popular fast food to Polish, especially the young ones due to its cheap price and quick preparation. Moreover, a few talented Bangladeshis also running their management and business development consulting business mainly in Warsaw, Krakow, and other big cities.

See also 
 Ethnic minorities in Poland
 Bangladesh–Poland relations

References

Bangladeshi diaspora
Immigration to Poland
Bangladesh–Poland relations
Ethnic groups in Poland